Aston Villa played the  1930–31 English football season in the Football League First Division. Villa started the season with four successive league wins, a record not matched until the 2020–21 season.

Villa scored 128 league goals in 42 matches, a First Division record. Villa's Pongo Waring finished as the leagues top scorer with 49 goals, overshadowing Eric Houghton who scored 30 goals. As of 2020, this remains the Villa record season for goals scored.

Other notable statistics included inflicting a 7-0 victory over Manchester United, the joint-heaviest competitive defeat for that club

Richard York played just four times in the 1930–31 campaign, as Villa finished second in the league with an English record of 128 top-flight league goals scored. 

After a trial with Villa in October 1930, goalkeeper, Harry Morton was signed as an amateur and made his club debut for the reserves in a Central League game against Everton Reserves on 22 November 1930. He went on to sign as a professional in March 1931.

Diary of season
8 Nov 1930 Aston Villa lost 5–2 at Arsenal Stadium in front of a crowd of 56,417.
14th Mar 1931: Villa stopped Arsenal in their tracks with a 5–1 victory at Villa Park.

League table

References

External links
Aston Villa football club match record: 1931

Aston Villa F.C. seasons
Aston Villa F.C. season